Alexandru Ioan Cuza is a commune in Iași County, Western Moldavia, Romania. It is composed of four villages: Alexandru Ioan Cuza, Kogălniceni, Șcheia and Volintirești.

The commune is named after 19th century Moldavian and Romanian statesman Alexandru Ioan Cuza.

References

Communes in Iași County
Localities in Western Moldavia